Cursor Miner (Robert Tubb) is an underground electronica producer from Selsey, England. Signed to Lo Recordings and Uncharted Audio in the UK, he has released four albums, Cursor Miner Requires Attention (2010), Danceflaw (2006), Cursor Miner Plays God (2004) and Explosive Piece Of Mind (2002). His music was described by Uncut as "electro Syd Barrett meets Aphex Twin meets Gary Numan with a touch of early Eno and a nod at Beck". He is also a popular remixer, and in 2005 had an underground hit with Temposhark's 'Little White Lie'.

References

External links
Lo Recordings: Cursor Miner
Discogs: Cursor Miner
MySpace: Cursor Miner
Fat! interview and mix
Proper Magazine interview

English DJs
Year of birth missing (living people)
Living people
People from Chichester